Euseius brevifistulae is a species of mite in the family Phytoseiidae.

References

brevifistulae
Articles created by Qbugbot
Animals described in 1997